Jesse Monroe Hatch (May 27, 1858February 20, 1940) was a Michigan politician.

Early life
Hatch was born in the Lee Center in Lee Township, Michigan on May 27, 1858, to parents James W. and Juliette Hatch. Hatch graduated from the University of Michigan Law School.

Career
Hatch served as the Calhoun County prosecuting attorney from 1901 to 1902. Hatch then served as a member of the Michigan House of Representatives from the Calhoun County 1st district from 1909 to 1910. Hatch was a Republican.

Personal life
Hatch married Ella Melissa Willard on October 7, 1885. Together they had at least nine children, including Blaine W. Hatch and Hazen J. Hatch. Hatch was widowed on November 14, 1937.

Death
Hatch died on February 20, 1940, in Marshall, Michigan. He was interred at Oakridge Cemetery in Marshall on February 22, 1940.

References

1858 births
1940 deaths
Michigan lawyers
University of Michigan Law School alumni
Republican Party members of the Michigan House of Representatives
Burials in Michigan
20th-century American politicians
20th-century American lawyers